The 2017 Big Ten Women's Lacrosse Tournament was held May 5 and May 7 at the Field Hockey & Lacrosse Complex in College Park, Maryland. For the first time, the top four teams from regular season play will earn berths in the tournament. Previously all schools qualified for the tournament. The seeds were based upon the teams' regular season conference record. The tournament format is single elimination.

Maryland successfully defended its 2016 tournament title and received the Big Ten Conference's automatic bid to the 2017 NCAA Division I Women's Lacrosse Championship.

The 2017 tournament was the first tournament Johns Hopkins was eligible to participate in as it was their first season in the conference.

Standings

Schedule

Bracket
Field Hockey & Lacrosse Complex – College Park, Maryland

References
 https://web.archive.org/web/20170509010509/http://www.bigten.org/sports/w-lacros/spec-rel/043017aaa.html
 https://web.archive.org/web/20170508165800/http://www.bigten.org/library/stats/wlax-confsked.html

External links
 Big Ten Women's Lacrosse
 @B1GLacrosse

Big Ten Tournament
Big Ten women's lacrosse tournament
2017 in sports in Maryland